New Conversations is an album by American jazz pianist Bill Evans, released in 1978.

New Conversations is Evans' third and final release in which he overdubs different piano tracks with his previously played track. The first release recorded in this manner was Conversations with Myself (1963) followed by Further Conversations with Myself (1967).

A noteworthy difference in this release is that Evans plays the Fender Rhodes electric piano as well as his customary acoustic piano.

Reception
The AllMusic review by Scott Yanow awarded the album three out of five stars writing "the results are less memorable than one might expect for Bill Evans seemed always at his best in trio settings".

Track listing
All songs by Bill Evans unless otherwise noted.
 "Song for Helen" – 7:48
 "Nobody Else but Me" (Oscar Hammerstein II, Jerome Kern) – 4:38
 "Maxine" – 4:40
 "For Nenette" – 7:19
 "I Love My Wife" (Cy Coleman, Michael Stewart) – 6:43
 "Remembering the Rain" – 4:29
 "After You" (Cole Porter) – 3:39
 "Reflections in D" (Duke Ellington) – 7:00

Personnel
Bill Evans – piano & Fender Rhodes electric piano

Production
Helen Keane – producer
Frank Laico – engineer, mixing
Nat Hentoff – liner notes

Chart positions

References

External links
The Bill Evans Memorial Library

1978 albums
Albums recorded at CBS 30th Street Studio
Bill Evans albums
Warner Records albums